Killing Ground is a Virgin Publishing original novel written by Steve Lyons and based on the long-running British science fiction television series Doctor Who. It features the Sixth Doctor and Grant Markham, as well as popular enemies the Cybermen.

Synopsis
The Doctor returns Grant to his home planet Agora. Upon arrival they discover that Agora has been conquered by the Cybermen, who have enslaved the population and return every three years to take the five hundred fittest humans for conversion. As rebellion is plotted, there is another time traveller at work: the Cybermen obsessed Archivist Hegelia, and her novice research partner, Graduand Jolarr. Can the Doctor save the day when locked away in a cell?

Influences
The design of the Cybermen explicitly described in this story is the design used in the 1975 Doctor Who television serial "Revenge of the Cybermen" as developed by BBC costume designer Prue Handley.

Details about the Cybermen including the term "CyberNomad" and references to Cyber-history, as well as the character of Hegelia and the Arc Hive from which she operates were originally conceived by David Banks for Cybermen, a study of the Cybermen both as a concept and a factual possibility and used with Banks's permission.

References

External links
The Cloister Library - Killing Ground

1996 British novels
1996 science fiction novels
Virgin Missing Adventures
Sixth Doctor novels
Novels by Steve Lyons
Cybermen novels
Novels set on fictional planets
Novels set in the 22nd century